Dorian Wilson (born in 1964) is an American conductor and musical director.

Wilson has achieved widespread acclaim, especially in Germany and Russia. In September 2010, Wilson opened the 2010/2011 season for the Chattanooga Symphony and Opera with a concert of Schubert's and Shostakovich's 5th symphonies. In October 2011 he conducted a Beethoven concert with Harriet Krijgh, Kim Barbier and Matsuda Lina in Hanoi.

In recognition of his work over the years, Wilson has been made Permanent Guest Conductor of the St Petersburg Symphony.

References

1964 births
Place of birth missing (living people)
Living people
American male conductors (music)
21st-century American conductors (music)
21st-century American male musicians